The Adventures of Ben Gunn is a British television series which originally aired on the BBC in 1958. It was based on R.F. Delderfield's 1956 novel The Adventures of Ben Gunn, written as a prequel to Robert Louis Stevenson's Treasure Island.

Main cast
 John Moffatt as Ben Gunn
 Peter Wyngarde as John Silver
 Rupert Davies as Captain Flint
 Meadows White as Ben Gunn - as an Old Man
 John H. Watson as Jim Hawkins
 Richard Coleman as Nick Allardyce
 Nigel Arkwright as Gabriel Pew
 Sean Lynch as Israel Hands
 Gertan Klauber as Black Dog
 Rodney Burke as Anderson
 Neil Hallett as Tom Morgan
 Terry Baker as Davis
 Olaf Pooley as Billy Bones
 Michael Corcoran as Darby Magraw
 Ayton Medas as Big Prosper 
 Basil Hoskins as Gaston
 Peter Vaughan as Sergeant Hoxton
 John Barrett as Private Barnes
 Anthony Harrison as Captain Ayrton

References

Bibliography
Baskin, Ellen . Serials on British Television, 1950-1994. Scolar Press, 1996.

External links
 

BBC television dramas
Television series based on Treasure Island
1958 British television series debuts
1958 British television series endings
English-language television shows